Cho Yong-Hyung (born 3 November 1983) is a South Korean footballer. He is known for his versatility as he can play as a full-back on either side of the pitch, as well as a centre back and a defensive midfielder.

Cho Yong-Hyung is praised in the K-League for his positional sense and steadiness under pressure. Cho has become regarded as the successor to Hong Myung-Bo, South Korea's legendary center half who took part in four FIFA World Cups.

Club career

K-League
Cho debuted for Bucheon SK in the 2005 season, when he was voted into the K-League Best XI after a successful season. He continued with the club in the 2006 season when it converted to Jeju United. In 2007, he spent a season at Seongnam Ilhwa Chunma, the most successful K-League club in terms of Championship victories, before transferring back to Jeju United for the 2008 season where he continues to play to this day.

Premier League
In 2010, it was claimed that European interest in Cho had risen. The English Premier League clubs Aston Villa, Fulham and Newcastle United, were interested in him and wanted to sign him in summer 2010 after the World Cup.

Qatar Stars League
Cho moved to the Qatar Stars League after the end of the 2010 World Cup to Al Rayyan Sports Club on a 2-year deal, until the end of the 2011–2012 season. After the end of the 2011–2012 season, Cho renewed his contract for one more year which kept him at the Qatari club until the end of the 2012–2013 season.

International career
Cho made his first appearance for South Korea against Chile on 30 January 2008. Cho was voted best defender at the 2010 East Asian Football Championship. He played for South Korea at the 2010 FIFA World Cup in South Africa.

Honors

Individual
K-League Best XI: 2005
East Asian Football Championship Best Defender: 2010

Team titles
Al Rayyan:
Sheikh Jassim Cup: 2012, 2013
Qatar Crown Prince Cup: 2012
Qatar Emir Cup: 2011, 2013

Club career statistics

References

External links
 
 National Team Player Record 
 
 
 

1983 births
Living people
Association football defenders
South Korean footballers
South Korean expatriate footballers
South Korea international footballers
Jeju United FC players
Gyeongnam FC players
Seongnam FC players
Al-Rayyan SC players
Al-Shamal SC players
Cangzhou Mighty Lions F.C. players
K League 1 players
Qatar Stars League players
Chinese Super League players
2010 FIFA World Cup players
2011 AFC Asian Cup players
Expatriate footballers in Qatar
Expatriate footballers in China
South Korean expatriate sportspeople in Qatar
South Korean expatriate sportspeople in China
Sportspeople from Incheon